Peter John Galloway,  (born 19 July 1954) is a British Anglican priest and historian, specialising in ecclesiastical history, architectural history, and the British orders of chivalry. From 2008 to 2019, he was Chaplain of the Queen's Chapel of the Savoy and Chaplain of the Royal Victorian Order. His is also a visiting professor of Brunel University London.

Early life and education
Galloway was born on 19 July 1954. He was educated at Westminster City School, an all-boys grammar school in London. He studied history at Goldsmiths' College, University of London, graduating with a Bachelor of Arts (BA) degree in 1976. In 1980, he matriculated into St Stephen's House, Oxford, an Anglo-Catholic theological college, to train for Holy Orders. He left in 1983 to be ordained into the Church of England. He continued his studies, undertaking postgraduate studies at King's College, London; he completed his Doctor of Philosophy (PhD) degree in 1987.

Career

Ordained ministry
Galloway was ordained in the Church of England as a deacon in 1983 and as a priest in 1984. From 1983 to 1986, he served his curacy at St John's Wood Church in the Diocese of London. He then served a further curacy at St Giles in the Fields between 1986 and 1990. In 1990, he joined Emmanuel Church, West Hampstead as Priest-in-Charge. He was appointed its Vicar in 1995. From 2002 to 2007, he was additionally Area Dean of North Camden (Hampstead).

In February 2008, Galloway left parish ministry having been appointed Chaplain of the Queen's Chapel of the Savoy and Chaplain of the Royal Victorian Order. He is additionally the Secretary for Church Livings for the Duchy of Lancaster. In June 2017, he made a Canon of the Chapel Royal.

Academic career
During his curacies, Galloway also taught religious studies at Arnold House School, an all-boys preparatory school in the City of Westminster. Since 2008, he has been an Honorary Professor in Politics and History at Brunel University London. He has also held leadership positions including as a Member of the Council of Goldsmiths' College from 1993 to 1999, and Member of the Council of the University of London from 1999 to 2008.

Galloway was Chair of Governors of St. Olave's Grammar School in Orpington for seven years, working alongside the controversial head Aydin Önaç. He resigned in September 2017, stating "the role of Chair requires far more time and attention than I am presently able to give.". A subsequent enquiry for Bromley Council highlighted many irregularities during Önaç's tenure, including illegal exclusion of students between years 12 and 13.

Personal life
In 2008, Galloway entered into a civil partnership with Michael Russell Stewart Turner.

Honours
In November 1986, Galloway was appointed an Officer of the Order of St John (OStJ). In October 1992, he was promoted to Chaplain of the Order of St John (ChStJ). In the 1996 Queen's Birthday Honours, he was appointed an Officer of the Order of the British Empire (OBE) "for services to the Order of the British Empire". In July 1997, he was promoted to Knight of the Order of St John (KStJ). On 11 May 2000, he was elected a Fellow of the Society of Antiquaries of London (FSA). On 27 November 2019 he was appointed a Lieutenant of the Royal Victorian Order.

Selected works

References

1954 births
Living people
20th-century English Anglican priests
21st-century English Anglican priests
Church of England priests
British historians of religion
Historians of Christianity
British architectural historians
English justices of the peace
Officers of the Order of the British Empire
Knights of the Order of St John
Fellows of the Society of Antiquaries of London
Alumni of Goldsmiths, University of London
Alumni of St Stephen's House, Oxford
Alumni of King's College London
LGBT Anglican clergy